The Gimnasio Multidisciplinario Nuevo Laredo (Nuevo Laredo Multidisciplinary Gymnasium), is a 4,000 seat indoor all purpose stadium, primarily used for basketball, located in the Ciudad Deportiva sports complex in Nuevo Laredo, Tamaulipas, Mexico. It is home to the two time Champions Toros de Nuevo Laredo Mexican professional basketball team from the Liga Nacional de Baloncesto Profesional. The stadium was completed in 2007 as part of Phase II of the Ciudad Deportiva, a new sports complex that also houses the Estadio Nuevo Laredo.

See also
Ciudad Deportiva
Estadio Nuevo Laredo
Venados de Nuevo Laredo
Nuevo Laredo

References

Indoor arenas in Mexico
Volleyball venues in Mexico
Basketball venues in Mexico
Nuevo Laredo
Sports in Laredo, Texas
Sports venues in Tamaulipas